Taumalolo is a Tongan surname. Notable people with the surname include:

Jason Taumalolo (born 1993), New Zealand rugby league player
Josh Taumalolo (born 1976) rugby union player
Sona Taumalolo (born 1981) New Zealand rugby union player

Tongan-language surnames